Shoghí Effendi (1 March 1897 – 4 November 1957) was the grandson and successor of ʻAbdu'l-Bahá, appointed to the role of Guardian of the Baháʼí Faith from 1921 until his death in 1957. He created a series of teaching plans that oversaw the expansion of the faith to many new countries, and also translated many of the writings of the Baháʼí central figures. He was succeeded by an interim arrangement of the Hands of the Cause until the election of the Universal House of Justice in 1963.

Shoghi Effendi spent his early life in ʻAkká, but went on to study in Haifa and Beirut, gaining an arts degree from the Syrian Protestant College in 1918, then serving as secretary and translator to ʻAbdu'l-Bahá. In 1920 he attended Balliol College, Oxford, where he studied political science and economics, but his second year was interrupted by the death of ʻAbdu'l-Bahá and his appointment as Guardian at the age of 24.

Shoghi Effendi was the leader and head of the Baháʼí Faith for 36 years. He sent more than 17,500 letters, mostly in Persian and English, directing and keeping up with the progress of existing Baháʼí communities, responding to persecution in the Middle East, coordinating teaching efforts, and building up the Baháʼí World Centre in the ʻAkká/Haifa area. He appointed 32 living individuals (and 10 posthumously) to the rank of Hand of the Cause, a prominent position that oversaw teaching the faith and protecting it from attacks, and oversaw the expansion of the religion from 1,034 localities in 1935 to 2,700 localities in 1953, and 14,437 localities in 1963. From the beginning to end of his leadership, the number of adherents to the Baháʼí Faith grew from 100,000 to 400,000.

He was born Shoghí Rabbání but published and is commonly known as Shoghi Effendi. Because he was the only example of the role of 'Guardian', he is commonly referred to as The Guardian by Baháʼís.

Background

Born in ʻAkká in the Acre Sanjak of the Ottoman Empire in March 1897, Shoghi Effendi was related to the Báb through his father, Mírzá Hádí Shírází, and to Baháʼu'lláh through his mother, Ḍíyáʼíyyih Khánum, the eldest daughter of ʻAbdu'l-Bahá. ʻAbdu'l-Bahá, who provided much of his initial training, greatly influenced Shoghi Effendi from the early years of his life. Shoghi Effendi learned prayers from his grandfather, who encouraged him to chant. ʻAbdu'l-Bahá also insisted that people address the child as "Shoghi Effendi", ("Effendi" signifies "Sir"), rather than simply as "Shoghi", as a mark of respect towards him.

From his early years, Shoghi Effendi was introduced to the suffering which accompanied the Baháʼís in ʻAkká, including the attacks by Mírzá Muhammad ʻAlí against ʻAbdu'l-Bahá. As a young boy, he was aware of the desire of Sultan Abdul Hamid II (reigned 1876–1909) to banish ʻAbdu'l-Bahá to the deserts of North Africa where he was expected to perish. At one point, Shoghi Effendi was warned not to drink coffee in the homes of any of the Baháʼís in the fear that he would be poisoned.

Tablet from ʻAbdu'l-Bahá
Being ʻAbdu'l-Bahá's eldest grandson, the first son of ʻAbdu'l-Bahá's eldest daughter Ḍíyáʼíyyih Khánum, Shoghi Effendi had a special relationship with his grandfather. Zia Baghdadi, a contemporary Baháʼí, relates that when Shoghi Effendi was only five years of age, he pestered his grandfather to write a tablet for him, which ʻAbdu'l-Bahá obliged:

Shoghi Effendi then set out to memorize a number of prayers, and chanted them as loud as he could. This caused family members to ask ʻAbdu'l-Bahá to quieten him down, a request which he apparently refused.

Education

Shoghi Effendi received his early education at home with the other children in the household, then attended a French Christian Brothers school in Haifa, and later boarded at another Catholic school in Beirut. He was to accompany his grandfather on his journeys to the West but was unable to proceed after port authorities in Naples prevented Shoghi Effendi from continuing due to illness.

He later attended the Syrian Protestant College (later known as the American University of Beirut) for his final years of high school and first years of university, where he earned an arts degree in 1918. He reports being very unhappy in school and often returned on vacations to Haifa to spend time with ʻAbdu'l-Bahá. During his studies, he dedicated himself to mastering English—adding this language to the Persian, Turkish, Arabic and French languages in which he was already fluent—so that he could translate the letters of ʻAbdu'l-Bahá and serve as his secretary.

Shoghi Effendi was protected from World War I due to the neutrality of the Syrian Protestant College. Though political tensions in 1917 meant the college was closed briefly, student life continued. In the summer of 1918 ʻAbdu'l-Bahá's life was in critical danger until the entry of General Allenby's troops to Haifa. With the Armistice looming and having completed his studies Shoghi Effendi was ready to return to his grandfather, and in Autumn of 1918 he went back to Haifa to assist ʻAbdu'l-Bahá in his mounting correspondence, spending nearly two years of constant companionship with him. In a private letter to a friend from late 1918 Shoghi Effendi reflects on the untold sufferings of the War but anticipates that "this is indeed the era of service".

After his time in Haifa he went to Balliol College, Oxford, in England, where he matriculated in "Economics and Social Sciences", while still perfecting his translation skills. Shoghi Effendi was happy during his time in Balliol. Accounts from his contemporaries remember him as a cheerful and popular student. He was acquainted with future British prime minister Anthony Eden but they were not close friends. His studies were interspersed with occasional trips around the United Kingdom to meet Baháʼí communities. Shoghi Effendi was particularly touched meeting the small group of Baháʼís from Manchester. During this period Shoghi Effendi began what would be a life-long affinity to aspects of British culture such as reading The Times everyday and his love for English literature.

Death of ʻAbdu'l-Bahá
While studying in England, on 29 November 1921, the news of ʻAbdu'l-Bahá's death reached Shoghi Effendi, which, according to Wellesley Tudor Pole, the deliverer of the cable, left him "in a state of collapse". After spending a couple of days with John Esslemont, and after some passport difficulties, he sailed from England accompanied with Sara Blomfield and his sister Ruhangiz on 16 December and arrived in Haifa on 29 December. A few days later he opened ʻAbdu'l-Bahá's Will and Testament, which was addressed to Shoghi Effendi. In it, he was appointed as ʻAbdu'l-Bahá's successor and head of the Baháʼí Faith.

Private life
Shoghi Effendi's personal life was largely subordinate to his work as Guardian of the religion. His lack of secretarial support with the mass of correspondence had left a pattern of hard work in Haifa interspersed with occasional summer breaks to Europe—in the early years often to the Swiss Alps. In 1929 and 1940 he also travelled through Africa from south to north. In public, Shoghi Effendi was variously described as composed and highly informed in international affairs. In private, his contemporaries remembered him as warm, informal and humorous. Shoghi Effendi would sleep very little and usually ate only once a day. He was short in stature, with dark hair, an olive complexion and hazel eyes. He was noted as not resembling his grandfather ʻAbdu'l-Bahá (who was taller and had blue eyes) but his great-grandfather Baháʼu'lláh.

Shoghi Effendi had a great love for the English language. He was an avid fan of English literature, and enjoyed reading the King James Bible. He was noted for speaking English in clipped received pronunciation, and Persian in an Isfahani dialect, inherited from his grandmother. Shoghi Effendi held Iranian (Persian) nationality throughout his life and travelled on an Iranian passport, although he never visited Iran.

Marriage

On March 24 1937, Shoghi Effendi married Mary Maxwell, entitled Rúhíyyih Khánum, a Canadian. She was the only child of May Maxwell, a disciple of ʻAbdu'l-Bahá, and William Sutherland Maxwell, a Canadian architect. Shoghi Effendi had first met Mary as a girl when she came on pilgrimage with her mother in 1923. She made another pilgrimage as a teenager with two of her mother's close friends. With Shoghi Effendi's encouragement, Mary became an active Baháʼí teacher and a letter written to him described her as "a beautiful and most refreshing girl to know". Shoghi Effendi wrote to Mary and her mother in 1936, inviting them to visit Haifa. Mother and daughter arrived in January 1937. The two quickly began a discreet courtship. Then 26 years old, Mary was a tall, athletic woman. Mary had been living in Nazi Germany for 18 months with her cousin prior to coming to Haifa. The couple married in the room of Bahíyyih Khánum in the House of ʻAbdu'l-Bahá in Haifa. The ceremony was a short, simple and quiet one in which Rúhíyyih Khánum wore black. Very few knew the wedding was taking place apart from the witnesses and a small group of residents of Haifa. Therefore, the marriage came as a great surprise to the world-wide Baháʼí community when the mother of Shoghi Effendi cabled the Baháʼís:

While Shoghi Effendi and Rúhíyyih Khánum never had children, Rúhíyyih Khánum became his constant companion and helpmate; in 1941, she became Shoghi Effendi's principal secretary in English. In a rare public statement, revealing his private sentiments, in 1951 he described his wife as "my helpmate, my shield in warding off the darts of Covenant breakers and my tireless collaborator in the arduous tasks I shoulder".

Accomplishments
Shoghi Effendi's leadership focused on two aspects: developing the administration of the religion and spreading it around the world.

Administration
The Baháʼí community was relatively small and undeveloped when he assumed leadership of the religion, and he strengthened and developed it over many years to support the administrative structure envisioned by ʻAbdu'l-Bahá. Under Shoghi Effendi's direction, National Spiritual Assemblies were formed, and many thousands of Local Spiritual Assemblies were created. He coordinated plans and resources to raise several of the continental Baháʼí Houses of Worship around the world; construction of which continued into the 1950s.

Starting in the late 1940s, after the establishment of the State of Israel, he started to develop the Baháʼí World Centre in Haifa, including the construction of the superstructure of the Shrine of the Báb, the International Archives, and the gardens at the Shrine of Baháʼu'lláh. 

In 1951 he appointed the International Baháʼí Council to act as a precursor to the Universal House of Justice, and appointed 32 living Hands of the Cause — the highest rank of service available, whose main function was to propagate and protect the religion.

Growth
From the time of his appointment as Guardian until his death the Baháʼí Faith grew from 100,000 to 400,000 members, capitalizing on prior growth and setting the stage for more. The countries and territories in which Baháʼís had representation went from 35 to 250. As Guardian and head of the religion, Shoghi Effendi communicated his vision to the Baháʼís of the world through his numerous letters and his meetings with pilgrims to Palestine. 

Starting in 1937, he set into motion a series of systematic plans to establish Baháʼí communities in all countries. A Ten Year Crusade was carried out from 1953 to 1963 with ambitious goals for expansion into almost every country and territory of the world.

Other
In a more secular cause, prior to World War II he supported the work of restoration-forester Richard St. Barbe Baker to reforest Palestine, introducing him to religious leaders from the major faiths of the region, from whom backing was secured for reforestation.

Leadership style
As a young student of twenty-four, Shoghi Effendi was initially shocked at the appointment as Guardian. He was also mourning the death of his grandfather to whom he had great attachment. The trauma of this culminated in him making retreats to the Swiss Alps. However, despite his youth, Shoghi Effendi had a clear idea of the goal he had for the religion. Oxford educated and Western in his style of dress, Shoghi Effendi was a stark contrast to his grandfather ʻAbdu'l-Bahá. He distanced himself from the local clergy and notability, and travelled little to visit Baháʼís unlike his grandfather. Correspondence and pilgrims were the way that Shoghi Effendi conveyed his messages. His talks are the subject to a great number of "pilgrim notes".

He also was concerned with matters dealing with Baháʼí belief and practice — as Guardian he was empowered to interpret the writings of Baháʼu'lláh and ʻAbdu'l-Bahá, and these were authoritative and binding, as specified in ʻAbdu'l-Bahá's will. His leadership style was however, quite different from that of ʻAbdu'l-Bahá, in that he signed his letters to the Baháʼís as "your true brother", and he did not refer to his own personal role, but instead to the institution of the guardianship. He requested that he be referred in letters and verbal addresses always as Shoghi Effendi, as opposed to any other appellation. He also distanced himself as a local notable. He was critical of the Baháʼís referring to him as a holy personage, asking them not to celebrate his birthday or have his picture on display.

Translations and writings

In his lifetime, Shoghi Effendi translated into English many of the writings of the Báb, Baháʼu'lláh and ʻAbdu'l-Bahá, including the Hidden Words in 1929, the Kitáb-i-Íqán in 1931, Gleanings in 1935 and Epistle to the Son of the Wolf in 1941. He also translated such historical texts as The Dawn-breakers. His significance is not just that of a translator, but also that of the designated and authoritative interpreter of the Baháʼí writings. His translations, therefore, are a guideline for all future translations of the Baháʼí writings. 

The vast majority of his writings were in the style of letters to Baháʼís from all parts of the globe. These letters, of which 17,500 have been collected thus far, are believed to number a total of 34,000 unique works. They ranged from routine correspondence regarding the affairs of Baháʼís around the world to lengthy letters to the Baháʼís of the world addressing specific themes. Some of his longer letters and collections of letters include World Order of Baháʼu'lláh, Advent of Divine Justice, and Promised Day is Come.

Other letters included statements on Baháʼí beliefs, history, morality, principles, administration and law. He also wrote obituaries of some distinguished Baháʼís. Many of his letters to individuals and assemblies have been compiled into several books which stand out as significant sources of literature for Baháʼís around the world. The only actual book he ever wrote was God Passes By in 1944 to commemorate the centennial anniversary of the religion. The book, which is in English, is an interpretive history of the first century of the Bábí and Baháʼí Faiths. A shorter Persian language version was also written.

Opposition
Mírzá Muhammad ʻAlí was ʻAbdu'l-Bahá's half brother and was mentioned by Baháʼu'lláh as having a station "beneath" that of ʻAbdu'l-Bahá. Muhammad ʻAli later fought ʻAbdu'l-Bahá for leadership and was ultimately excommunicated, along with several others in the Haifa/ʻAkká area who supported him. When Shoghi Effendi was appointed Guardian Muhammad ʻAli tried to revive his claim to leadership, suggesting that Baháʼu'lláh's mention of him in the Kitáb-i-'Ahd amounted to a succession of leadership.

After Shoghi Effendi's death, Rúhíyyih Khánum published parts of her personal diaries to show glimpses of Shoghi Effendi's life. She recalls a great deal of pain and suffering caused by his immediate family, and Baháʼís in Haifa.

Throughout Shoghi Effendi's life, nearly all remaining family members and descendants of ʻAbdu'l-Bahá were expelled by him as covenant-breakers when they didn't abide by Shoghi Effendi's request to cut contact with covenant-breakers, as specified by ʻAbdu'l-Bahá. Other branches of Baháʼu'lláh's family had already been declared Covenant-breakers in ʻAbdu'l-Bahá's Will and Testament. At the time of his death, there were no living descendants of Baháʼu'lláh that remained loyal to him.

Unexpected death

Shoghi Effendi's death came unexpectedly in London, on 4 November 1957, as he was travelling to Britain and caught the Asian Flu, during the pandemic which killed two million worldwide, and he is buried there in New Southgate Cemetery. His wife sent the following cable:

Future hereditary Guardians were envisioned in the Baháʼí scripture by appointment from one to the next. Each Guardian was to be appointed by the previous from among the male descendants of Baháʼu'lláh, preferably according to primogeniture. The appointment was to be made during the Guardian's lifetime and clearly assented to by a group of Hands of the Cause. At the time of Shoghi Effendi's death, all living male descendants of Baháʼu'lláh had been declared Covenant-breakers by either ʻAbdu'l-Bahá or Shoghi Effendi, leaving no suitable living candidates. This created a severe crisis of leadership. The 27 living Hands gathered in a series of six secret conclaves (or signed agreements if they were absent) to decide how to navigate the uncharted situation. The Hands of the Cause unanimously voted it was impossible to legitimately recognize and assent to a successor. They made an announcement on 25 November 1957 to assume control of the Faith, certified that Shoghi Effendi had left no will or appointment of successor, said that no appointment could have been made, and elected nine of their members to stay at the Baháʼí World Centre in Haifa to exercise the executive functions of the Guardian (these were known as the Custodians).

Ministry of the Custodians
In Shoghi Effendi's final message to the Baha'i World, dated October 1957, he named the Hands of the Cause of God, "the Chief Stewards of Baháʼu'lláh's embryonic World Commonwealth." Following the death of Shoghi Effendi, the Baháʼí Faith was temporarily stewarded by the Hands of the Cause, who elected among themselves nine "Custodians" to serve in Haifa as the head of the Faith. They reserved to the "entire body of the Hands of the Cause" the responsibility to determine the transition of the International Baháʼí Council into the Universal House of Justice, and that the Custodians reserved to themselves the authority to determine and expel Covenant-breakers. This stewardship oversaw the execution of the final years of Shoghi Effendi's ordinances of the ten year crusade (which lasted until 1963) culminating and transitioning to the election and establishment of the Universal House of Justice, at the first Baha'i World Congress in 1963.

As early as January 1959, Mason Remey, one of the custodial Hands, believed that he was the second Guardian and successor to Shoghi Effendi. That summer after a conclave of the Hands in Haifa, Remey abandoned his position and moved to Washington D.C., then soon after announced his claim to absolute leadership, causing a minor schism that attracted about 100 followers, mostly in the United States. Remey was excommunicated by a unanimous decision of the remaining 26 Hands. Although initially disturbed, the mainstream Baháʼís paid little attention to his movement within a few years.

Election of the Universal House of Justice
At the end of the Ten Year Crusade in 1963, the Universal House of Justice was first elected. It was authorized to adjudicate on situations not covered in scripture. As its first order of business, the Universal House of Justice evaluated the situation caused by the fact that the Guardian had not appointed a successor. It determined that under the circumstances, given the criteria for succession described in the Will and Testament of ʻAbdu'l-Bahá, there was no legitimate way for another Guardian to be appointed. Therefore, although the Will and Testament of ʻAbdu'l-Bahá leaves provisions for a succession of Guardians, Shoghi Effendi remains the first and last occupant of this office.

Bahá'u'lláh envisioned a scenario in the Kitáb-i-Aqdas in which the line of Guardians would be broken prior to the establishment of the Universal House of Justice, and in the interim the Hands of the Cause of God would administer the affairs of the Baha'i community.

Guardianship

The institution of the 'Guardian' provided a hereditary line of heads of the religion, in many respects similar to the Shia Imamate. Each Guardian was to be appointed by the previous from among the male descendants of Baháʼu'lláh, preferably according to primogeniture. The appointment was to be made during the Guardian's lifetime and clearly assented to by a group of Hands of the Cause. The Guardian would be the head of the Universal House of Justice, and had the authority to expel its members. He would also be responsible for the receipt of Huqúqu'lláh, appoint new Hands of the Cause, provide "authoritative and binding" interpretations of the Baháʼí writings, and excommunicate Covenant-breakers.

The issue of successorship to ʻAbdu'l-Bahá was in the minds of early Baháʼís, and although the Universal House of Justice was an institution mentioned by Baháʼu'lláh, the institution of the Guardianship was not clearly introduced until the Will and Testament of ʻAbdu'l-Bahá was publicly read after his death.

In the will, Shoghi Effendi found that he had been designated as "the Sign of God, the chosen branch, the Guardian of the Cause of God". He also learned that he had been designated as this when he was still a small child. As Guardian, he was appointed as head of the religion, someone whom the Baháʼís had to look to for guidance.

Shoghi Effendi on the Guardianship
Building on the foundation that had been established in ʻAbdu'l-Bahá's will, Shoghi Effendi elaborated on the role of the Guardian in several works, including Baháʼí Administration and the World Order of Baháʼu'lláh. In those works, he went to great lengths to emphasize that he himself and any future Guardian should never be viewed as equal to ʻAbdu'l-Bahá, or regarded as a holy person. He asked Baháʼís not to celebrate his birthday or have his picture on display. In his correspondences, Shoghi Effendi signed his letters to Baháʼís as "brother" and "co-worker," to the extent that even when addressing youth, he referred to himself as "Your True Brother."

Shoghi Effendi wrote that the infallibility of his interpretations only extended to matters relating to the Baháʼí Faith and not subjects such as economics and science.

In his writings, Shoghi Effendi delineates a distinct separation of powers between the "twin pillars" of the Guardianship and the Universal House of Justice. The roles of the Guardianship and the Universal House of Justice are complementary, the former providing authoritative interpretation, and the latter providing flexibility and the authority to adjudicate on "questions that are obscure and matters that are not expressly recorded in the Book." Shoghi Effendi went into detail explaining that the institutions are interdependent and had their own specific spheres of jurisdiction. For example, the Guardian could define the sphere of legislative action and request that a particular decision be reconsidered, but could not dictate the constitution, override the decisions, or influence the election of the Universal House of Justice. In explaining the importance of the Guardianship, Shoghi Effendi wrote that without it the World Order of Baháʼu'lláh would be "mutilated." In its legislation the Universal House of Justice turns to the mass of interpretation left by Shoghi Effendi.

See also

 Baháʼí administration
 Baháʼí World Centre
 Baháʼí divisions
 Baháʼí Terraces

Notes

Citations

References

Further reading

External links

 Shoghi Effendi - resources from bahai.org
 Writings of Shoghi Effendi – authenticated writings in English
 Biography of Shoghi Effendi
 The Guardian's Resting Place – from the official website of the Baha'is of the UK 
 The first documentary film about his life 
 Meditations on the Eve of November Fourth – reflections written by Abu'l-Qásim Faizi on the eve of Shoghi Effendi's passing

Alumni of Balliol College, Oxford
Iranian Bahá'ís
Family of Baháʼu'lláh
1897 births
1957 deaths
Burials at New Southgate Cemetery
20th-century Iranian people
Religious leaders in the United Kingdom
People from the Ottoman Empire of Iranian descent